Godofredo P. Ramos Airport (Aklanon: Paeoparan it Godofredo P. Ramos, Hiligaynon: Hulugpaan sang Godofredo P. Ramos) , also known as Caticlan Airport and recently, Boracay Airport by its developer Trans Aire, is an airport serving the general area of the municipality of Malay, located in the province of Aklan in the Philippines.  It is one of the two gateways to Boracay, the other being Kalibo International Airport in Kalibo. The airport is classified as a Class 1 principal (major domestic) airport by the Civil Aviation Authority of the Philippines.

The airport is the fourth-busiest airport in the Philippines and the busiest in the Western Visayas region, serving 2.3 million passengers in 2022.

Since November 7, 2012, the airport has been named after the late Godofredo P. Ramos, a former congressman who is known as the "Father of Aklan" as he authored a house bill proposing the separation of Aklan from the province of Capiz that was later approved in 1956. However, the name Caticlan Airport derives from its location in the barangay of Caticlan in the municipality of Malay.

History

Prior to 1996, chartered airlines served the airport. In April 1996, Asian Spirit became the first scheduled airline to serve the airport, launching two daily flights from Manila using second-hand Dash 7 aircraft. South East Asian Airlines later followed in 2005 using Dornier 328 aircraft. In February 2008, Cebu Pacific launched flights to Caticlan using ATR 72-500 aircraft, followed by PAL Express on May 5 using Dash 8 Q300 aircraft.

Due to the airport's short runway prior to its expansion, the airport was restricted to small aircraft. As Boracay-bound tourists increased, passenger traffic increased, causing an increase in congestion at the airport which caused inconvenient service and safety hazards to travelers. From 1994 to 2004, the airport experienced an average annual growth of 31 percent.

In addition, during bad weather, flights are diverted to Kalibo International Airport,  from Caticlan.

Expansion

In January 2008, the National Economic and Development Authority approved the expansion of the airport, which would be undertaken by the Caticlan International Airport and Development Corporation (CIADC), a private company. The upgrading works would enable the airport not only to support jet aircraft but also to serve international destinations.

Solicited as a Build-Operate-Transfer project and financed by a 70-30 mixture of bank loan and private sector equity, around 25 percent of the allocated funds would be used to clear a hill near the airport's proximity, while an additional 18 percent would be allocated for land reclamation to accommodate an extended runway. The 25-year concession agreement was signed in 2009.

In January 2010, Boracay Foundation Inc. opposed the project due to the negative environmental effects of leveling a hill near the airport. The chairman of the foundation group said that leveling the hill would damage Boracay's ecosystem, while saying that the airport in Kalibo should be the international airport for a better environmental impact. The group also supported limited developments in Caticlan for domestic operations only.

In April 2010, San Miguel Corporation acquired a majority stake in CIADC. It earmarked US$300 million for the project in June 2011.
 
The airport terminal underwent renovations starting 2009 and was inaugurated on June 25, 2011, with President Benigno Aquino III leading the inauguration.

On November 18, 2016, the extended runway and new apron opened for commercial operations. The first Airbus A320 flight to land was Philippine Airlines Flight 2059 from Manila, a flight operated by PAL Express, on that day. Cebu Pacific followed suit on November 23, landing its first A320 flight as Flight 899. Both airlines upgraded most of their Caticlan flights to A320s, having previously served by turboprops. Philippines AirAsia, which operates an all-A320 fleet, launched flights to the airport on March 15, 2017, landing its first flight as Flight 221.

International flights commenced on December 26, 2022, when the first international flight, an Airbus A320 operating as Royal Air Philippines Flight 258 from Taoyuan International Airport, landed at the airport.

Structure

Runway
It can accommodate aircraft such as the ATR 42, ATR 72, Bombardier Dash-8, Airbus A220, Airbus A320 family, and the Airbus A320neo family. The largest aircraft type capable of landing in this airport is the Airbus A321. It was upgraded to the current dimensions in 2016.

Navigational equipment for night operations were installed in the runway, making the airport capable of night operations since 2017. Cebu Pacific became the first airline to operate night flights to the airport.

Terminal and apron
Godofredo P. Ramos Airport has two separate passenger terminals. The old terminal, located in barangay Caticlan in Malay, is currently used for departing passengers. It was used for both departing and arriving passengers until the opening of the new apron in the nearby municipality of Nabas. An interim terminal was built at the new apron and is used for arriving passengers to accommodate the increase in passenger traffic. A permanent two-level passenger terminal building is currently under construction. The new terminal would have twelve jet bridges and a capacity of six million passengers annually.

The old apron used to accommodate four turboprop aircraft, while the new apron has twelve parking bays that can accommodate larger Airbus A320 aircraft.

Airlines and destinations

Statistics
Data from Civil Aviation Authority of the Philippines (CAAP).

Ground transport

Bus and destinations
Ceres Liner - Kalibo, Iloilo
Ceres Tours - Iloilo 
Ceres Transport - Bacolod, Iloilo, Manila

Incidents and accidents
On July 19, 2005, Interisland Airlines aircraft RP-C2803, an arriving Yakovlev 40A aircraft touched down short of runway 06. A tire burst as it struck the raised lip of the runway. When removing the airplane from the runway the undercarriage collapsed, causing substantial damage to the aircraft. The aircraft was occupied by 3 crew and 20 passengers. There were no fatalities.
On November 2, 2006, Interisland Airlines aircraft RP-C2695, a  Yakovlev 40A aircraft, arrived to pick up a group of tourists. On landing at runway 06, the left main gear tire burst. The aircraft started to swerve to the left, towards the apron were a DHC-7 had just started engines. The crew avoided collision with the DHC-7. After passing the apron, the Yak-40 drifted sideways entering the grass on the left side of the runway. Because of lateral forces, the right main gear collapsed. The aircraft came to rest on the edge of the runway. After three hours the airplane was towed off the runway into the grass. On arrival, the aircraft had no passengers. There were no fatalities.
On January 11, 2009, Zest Airways Flight 865, a Xian MA60 with 22 passengers three crew aboard, undershot runway 06 when it landed, swerved sharply to the left when it touched the runway after the initial impact and hit a concrete barrier seriously damaging its nose. The plane's landing gears and propellers also suffered major damage. Three people were injured. There were no fatalities.
On June 25, 2009, Zest Airways Flight 863, a Xian MA60 with 54 passengers and five crew aboard, overshot the runway when it landed at the airport. The aircraft totally lost its braking capability, causing it to overshoot runway 24. There were no injuries.

Notes

References

External links

Airports in the Philippines
Malay, Aklan
Buildings and structures in Aklan
Transportation in the Visayas